Prime Cuts may refer to:
 Prime Cuts (Jordan Rudess album), a compilation album by Jordan Rudess
 Prime Cuts, a compilation album by Steve Morse
 Prime Cuts (Suicidal Tendencies album), a compilation album by Suicidal Tendencies
 Prime Cuts (Shadow Gallery album), a compilation album by Shadow Gallery
 Prime Cuts (Peter Lang album), a 1977 album by Peter Lang
 Prime Cuts (Tempest album), a 2008 compilation album by Tempest